Ozark pudding is a dry fruit custard with nuts that, as the name implies, appears to originate in Missouri, being named after The Ozarks region. It is most famous for being a favorite food of President Harry Truman, a recipe by his wife Bess Truman having been widely published in the 1950s as her contribution to the Congressional Club Cookbook.

Ingredients and preparation
Ozark pudding always contains fruit and nuts, which comprises most of its volume, with the custard only serving as a glue between the packed bits.

History
According to the book All American Desserts, the predecessor for Ozark pudding, gateau aux noisettes (cake with hazelnuts), was brought to the New World by the French Huguenots who settled in Charleston, South Carolina. Because hazelnuts were not common in the US, pecans were used, and it came to be known as Huguenot torte. By the time the recipe reached the Ozarks and acquired its current name, black walnuts were a common alternative to pecans.

See also
 Mayfair salad dressing, specialty at a St. Louis hotel that Truman stayed at
 List of custard desserts

References

Custard desserts
Cuisine of the Midwestern United States
Missouri culture
Nut dishes